Marshyntsi is one of the Romanian-speaking villages of the Chernivtsi Raion (district) of Chernivtsi Oblast (province) in western Ukraine (the historical region of Bessarabia). It belongs to Novoselytsia urban hromada, one of the hromadas of Ukraine.

The first written mention of this village dates back to 1611.  The village is located 30 km from Chernivtsi.

Until 18 July 2020, Marshyntsi belonged to Novoselytsia Raion. The raion was abolished in July 2020 as part of the administrative reform of Ukraine, which reduced the number of raions of Chernivtsi Oblast to three. The area of Novoselytsia Raion was split between Chernivtsi and Dnistrovskyi Raions, with Marshyntsi being transferred to Chernivtsi Raion.

Notable people
Teodor Bordeianu — agronomist and pomologist
Nataliia Lupu — athlete
Sofia Rotaru — singer-songwriter, record producer, film producer, fashion designer, dancer, actress
Lilia Sandulesu — singer

Referenced

Villages in Chernivtsi Raion
Khotinsky Uyezd
Populated places on the Prut